Serafín: La película, is a Mexican film written by Xavier Robles and directed by René Cardona and was produced by Coyoácan Films and distributed by Warner Bros., through its Family Entertainment banner and was released in 2001. It is a sequel to the telenovela of Televisa Serafín produced by José Alberto Castro in 1999.

Plot 
Serafín, is the story of a small, kindly guardian angel who protects a group of children called "the gang".Together they will undertake an adventure side of strange characters and will face the evil Lucio, who is now accompanied by his girlfriend named flame.

Cast 
María Fernanda Morales as Serafín (voice)
Jordi Landeta as Pepe
Sherlyn as Elisa
Pedro Armendáriz Jr. as Thinker (voice)
Nayeli Dainzú as Flama
Consuelo Duval as Lindaflor (voice)
Miguel Galván as Roque
Roberto Navarro as Tomás
Germán Robles as Don Baúl (voice)
Enrique Rocha as Lucio
Yurem Rojas as Cachito
Jorge Van Rankin as Pomín (voice)
Julio Vega as Aníbal
Horacio Villalobos as Hongo #2
Evita Muñoz as Coco (voice)

References

External links 

Mexican animated films
Warner Bros. films
2000s Mexican films
Mexican comedy films